Limnozetidae is a family of mites belonging to the order Sarcoptiformes.

Genera:
 Antarcticola Wallwork, 1967
 Limnozetella Willmann, 1932
 Limnozetes Hull, 1916

References

Sarcoptiformes